Portsmouth Navy Seahawks were a rugby league team based in Gosport, Hampshire. They played in the South Premier Division of the Rugby League Conference. The Seahawks, as a club, is open to non-service players as well as members of the Royal Navy. The club is now renamed United Services Portsmouth Seahawks Rugby League Club.

History
Gosport & Fareham Vikings joined the London & South Division of the Rugby League Conference in 2003. The club made a mid-season withdrawal in 2005 and didn't return to the Conference until 2007, this time to the South Division.

Gosport & Fareham Vikings became Portsmouth Navy Seahawks for the 2008 season and took part in the Rugby League Conference South Premier Division finishing fifth.

Club honours
 London & South East League: 2012, 2013, 2015
 West of England: 2016

External links
 Seahawks Official Website

Rugby League Conference teams
Sport in Portsmouth
Royal Navy
Rugby clubs established in 2003
Rugby league teams in Hampshire
English rugby league teams